The 2018 Men's Australian Hockey League was the 26th edition of the men's field hockey tournament. The 2018 edition of the tournament was be held between 6 – 28 October, and featured a new format from previous editions.

The finals phase of the 2018 tournament was held in the Queensland city of the Gold Coast, from the 25 – 28 October.

QLD Blades won the tournament for a record tenth time after defeating NSW Waratahs 5–3 in the gold-medal match. Tassie Tigers claimed the bronze medal after defeating the Canberra Lakers 1–0.

Competition format
Unlike previous editions of the Men's Australian Hockey League, the 2018 edition will include a very different format. Instead of the tournament being held at a single venue, the teams will play at least one home and away match during the pool stage, before converging on a singular venue for the Classification Round.

The teams will be divided into two Pool A and Pool B, both consisting of four teams, with each team playing each other once. The teams will then progress to the Classification round, with each team playing a qualifying match, before progressing to either the fifth to eighth place playoffs, or the first to fourth place playoffs.

Participating teams

 Canberra Lakers
 NSW Waratahs
 NT Stingers
 QLD Blades
 SA Hotshots
 Tassie Tigers
 VIC Vikings
 WA Thundersticks

Venues

Results

Preliminary round

Pool A

Pool B

Classification round

Quarterfinals

Fifth to eighth place classification

Crossover

Seventh and eighth place

Fifth and sixth place

First to fourth place classification

Semi-finals

Third and fourth place

Final

Awards

Statistics

Final standings

Goalscorers

References

External links

2018
2018 in Australian field hockey
Sports competitions on the Gold Coast, Queensland